The 2003 Akron Zips football team represented the University of Akron in the 2003 NCAA Division I-A football season. Akron competed as a member of the East Division of the Mid-American Conference (MAC). The Zips were led by head coach Lee Owens.

Schedule

Roster

References

Akron
Akron Zips football seasons
Akron Zips football